Sanoorapatti is a village in the Thanjavur taluk of Thanjavur district, Tamil Nadu, India.

Demographics 

As per the 2001 census, Sanoorapatti had a total population of 2943 with 1458 males and 1485 females. The sex ratio was 1019. The literacy rate was 71.

References 

 

Villages in Thanjavur district